The IV Corps of the Ottoman Empire (Turkish: 4 ncü Kolordu or Dördüncü Kolordu) was one of the corps of the Ottoman Army. It was formed in the early 20th century during Ottoman military reforms. It was disbanded at the end of World War I.

Formation

Order of Battle, 1911 
With further reorganizations of the Ottoman Army, to include the creation of corps level headquarters, by 1911 the IV Corps was headquartered in Adrianople. The Corps before the First Balkan War in 1911 was structured as such:

IV Corps, Harbiye, Adrianople (Ferik Ahmet Abuk Pasha)
10th Infantry Division, Adrianople (Mirliva Mehmet Pasha)
28th Infantry Regiment, Adrianople
29th Infantry Regiment, Cisr-i Mustafa Paşa
30th Infantry Regiment, Adrianople
10th Rifle Battalion, Adrianople
10th Field Artillery Regiment, Adrianople
10th Division Band, Adrianople
11th Infantry Division, Dedeağaç
31st Infantry Regiment, Adrianople
32nd Infantry Regiment, Dedeağaç
33rd Infantry Regiment, Dedeağaç
11th Rifle Battalion, Dedeağaç
11th Field Artillery Regiment, Dedeağaç
11th Division Band, Dedeağaç
12th Infantry Division, Gümülcine
34th Infantry Regiment, Yemen
35th Infantry Regiment, İskeçe
36th Infantry Regiment, Kırcaali
12th Rifle Battalion, Gümlücine
12th Field Artillery Regiment, Adrianople
12th Division Band, Gümlücine
Units of IV Corps
4th Rifle Regiment, Yemen
4th Cavalry Brigade, Adrianople
9th Cavalry Regiment, Dimetoka
11th Cavalry Regiment, Adrianople
12th Cavalry Regiment, Adrianople
5th Cavalry Brigade, Adrianople
1st Cavalry Regiment, Adrianople
2nd Cavalry Regiment, Adrianople
5th Field Howitzer Battalion, Adrianople
2nd Horse Artillery Battalion, Adrianople
5th Mountain Artillery Battalion, Kırcaali
4th Engineer Battalion, Adrianople
4th Transport Battalion, Adrianople
Border companies x 3
Medical Detachment
Adrianople Fortified Zone Command, Adrianople
6th Heavy Artillery Regiment, Adrianople
7th Heavy Artillery Regiment, Adrianople
8th Heavy Artillery Regiment, Adrianople
9th Heavy Artillery Regiment, Adrianople
Heavy Field Howitzer Battalion, Adrianople
Engineer Battalion, Adrianople
Machine-Gun companies x 5

Balkan Wars

Order of Battle, October 17, 1912 
On October 17, 1912, the corps was structured as follows:

IV Provisional Corps (Thrace, under the command of the Eastern Army)
12th Division
Izmit Redif Division, Bursa Redif Division

Order of Battle, October 29, 1912 
On October 29, 1912, the corps was structured as follows:

IV Provisional Corps (Thrace, under the command of the First Eastern Army)
12th Division
Izmit Redif Division, Çanakkale Redif Division

Order of Battle, July 1913 
IV Corps
29th Division, Ereğli Infantry Division, Kayseri Infantry Division

World War I

Order of Battle, August 1914, November 1914 
In August 1914, November 1914, the corps was structured as follows:

IV Corps (Thrace)
10th Division, 11th Division, 12th Division

Order of Battle, April 1915 
In late April 1915, the corps was structured as follows:

IV Corps (Thrace)
10th Division, 12th Division

Order of Battle, Late Summer 1915, January 1916 
In late Summer 1915, January 1916, the corps was structured as follows:

IV Corps (Gallipoli)
10th Division, 11th Division, 12th Division

Order of Battle, August 1916 
In August 1916, the corps was structured as follows:

IV Corps (Caucasus)
47th Division, 48th Division

Order of Battle, December 1916 
In December 1916, the corps was structured as follows:

IV Corps (Caucasus)
11th Division, 12th Division

Order of Battle, August 1917 
In August 1917, the corps was structured as follows:

IV Corps (Caucasus)
11th Division, 12th Division, 48th Division

Order of Battle, January 1918 
In January 1918, the corps was structured as follows:

IV Corps (Caucasus)
5th Division, 8th Division, 12th Division

Order of Battle, June 1918 
In June 1918, the corps was structured as follows:

IV Corps (Caucasus)
5th Division, 11th Division, 12th Division

Sources

Corps of the Ottoman Empire
Military units and formations of the Ottoman Empire in the Balkan Wars
Military units and formations of the Ottoman Empire in World War I
Military units and formations established in 1911
1911 establishments in the Ottoman Empire
Adrianople vilayet
Aidin Vilayet